Kuyreh Guyzeh (also Romanized as Kūyreh Gūyzeh; also known as Kūreh Gūzeh and Kūyreh Kūyz) is a village in Buin Rural District, Nanur District, Baneh County, Kurdistan Province, Iran. At the 2006 census, its population was 45, in 7 families. The village is populated by Kurds.

References 

Towns and villages in Baneh County
Kurdish settlements in Kurdistan Province